Sacred Heart Parish - designated for Polish immigrants in New Britain, Connecticut, United States.

 Founded on August 10, 1894. It is one of the oldest Polish-American Roman Catholic parishes in New England in the Archdiocese of Hartford.

History 
On August 10, 1894, the New Britain Polish Catholic community became a mission of the Archdiocese's oldest Polish Catholic parish, St. Stanislaus Parish, Meriden. The mission phase ended on September 10, 1895, when Fr. Lucyan Bójnowski was appointed pastor in New Britain. Initially, the Polish-born priest's new parish was named St. Casimir the King, but this name was officially changed in 1896 to honor the Sacred Heart. The original Sacred Heart Church, located on Orange St., was dedicated by Bishop Michael Tierney on October 4, 1896.

A new much larger church was designed by architect George P. B. Alderman of Holyoke, MA shortly after the construction of the first church.

Bibliography 
 
 Dolores Liptak, review of Daniel S. Buczek, People of God: A Centennial History of Sacred Heart of Jesus Parish, New Britain, Connecticut (1998), in Catholic Historical Review 85:2 (1999), pp. 324–325.
 
 The Official Catholic Directory in USA

External links 
 Sacred Heart - Diocesan information
 Sacred Heart - ParishesOnline.com
 Archdiocese of Hartford

Roman Catholic parishes of Archdiocese of Hartford
Polish-American Roman Catholic parishes in Connecticut
Buildings and structures in New Britain, Connecticut
Churches in Hartford County, Connecticut
Polish Cathedral style architecture